The New Zealand Labour Party, or simply Labour, is a centre-left political party in New Zealand. The party's platform programme describes its founding principle as democratic socialism, while observers describe Labour as social-democratic and pragmatic in practice. The party participates in the international Progressive Alliance. It is one of two major political parties in New Zealand, alongside its traditional rival, the National Party.

The New Zealand Labour Party formed in 1916 out of various socialist parties and trade unions. It is the country's oldest political party still in existence. Alongside the National Party, Labour has alternated in leading governments of New Zealand since the 1930s. , there have been six periods of Labour government under 11 Labour prime ministers. The party has traditionally been supported by working class, urban, Māori, Pasifika, immigrant and trade unionist New Zealanders, and has had strongholds in inner cities and the Māori seats for much of its existence. The party is currently strongest in Wellington, Palmerston North and Hamilton, where it won all of the electorates in 2020. Labour also won the party vote in 71 out of 72 electorates in that election, making them overwhelmingly the most successful political party of the MMP era. 

The party first came to power under prime ministers Michael Joseph Savage and Peter Fraser from 1935 to 1949, when it established New Zealand's welfare state. It governed from 1957 to 1960, and again from 1972 to 1975. In 1974, the prime minister Norman Kirk died in office, which contributed to a decline in party support. Up to the 1980s, the party advocated a strong role for governments in economic and social matters. When it governed from 1984 to 1990, Labour instead privatised state assets and reduced the role of the state in the economy; Labour prime minister David Lange also introduced New Zealand's nuclear-free policy. Labour again became the largest party from 1999 to 2008, when it governed in coalition with, or based on negotiated support from, several minor parties; Helen Clark became the first Labour prime minister to secure a third term in office.

In the 2017 general election the party, under Jacinda Ardern, returned to prominence with its best showing since the 2005 general election, winning 36.9% of the party vote and 46 seats. On 19 October 2017, Labour formed a minority coalition government with New Zealand First, with confidence and supply from the Green Party. In the 2020 general election, Labour won in a landslide, winning an overall majority of 10 and 50.01% of the vote. Chris Hipkins serves as the party leader and prime minister, while Kelvin Davis is the deputy leader.

History 

The founding of the New Zealand Labour Party, on 7 July 1916 in Wellington,  brought together socialist groups advocating proportional representation; the abolition of the country quota; the recall of members of Parliament; as well as the nationalisation of production and of exchange. Despite the Labour Party's Wellington origins, the West Coast town of Blackball is regarded as the "spiritual home" of the party, because it was the site of a miners' strike in 1908 that led to the founding of the first nationwide federation of trade unions (the "Red Federation"). The party was created by, and has always been influenced by, trade unions; the Labour Party identifies itself as part of the wider labour movement in New Zealand.

Formation (1901–1916) 

The New Zealand Labour Party was an amalgamation of a number of earlier groups, the oldest of which was founded in 1901. The process of unifying these diverse groups into a single party was difficult, with tensions between different factions running strong.

At the turn of the 20th century, the radical side of New Zealand working class politics was represented by the Socialist Party, founded in 1901. The more moderate leftists generally supported the Liberal Party. This established the basic dividing line in New Zealand's left-wing politics – the Socialists tended to be revolutionary and militant, while the moderates focused instead on progressive reform.

In 1910 the Independent Political Labour League was relaunched as an organisation called the Labour Party, distinct from the modern party. Soon, however, the leaders of the new organisation decided that additional effort was needed to promote left-wing cooperation, and organised a "Unity Conference". The Socialists refused to attend, but several independent labour activists agreed. The United Labour Party was born.

Soon afterward, the labour movement went through the 1912 Waihi miners' strike, a major industrial disturbance prompted by radicals in the union movement. The movement split over supporting or opposing the radicals, and in the end, the conservative Reform Party government of William Massey suppressed the strike by force. In the strike's aftermath, there was a major drive to end the divisions in the labour movement and to establish a united front. Accordingly, Walter Thomas Mills organised another Unity Conference, and this time the Socialists attended. The resulting group was named the Social Democratic Party.

Not all members of the United Labour Party accepted the new organisation, however, and some continued under their own banner. Gradually, however, the differences between the Social Democrats and the ULP Remnant broke down, and in 1915 they formed a unified caucus – both to oppose Reform better and to differentiate themselves from the Liberals. A year later yet another gathering took place. This time, all major factions of the labour movement agreed to unite, establishing the modern Labour Party.

Electoral record of constituent parties pre–1916 Labour

Early years (1916–1935) 
Almost immediately, the new Labour Party became involved in the acrimonious debate about conscription which arose during World War I. The party strongly opposed conscription, and several leading members – Peter Fraser, Harry Holland, Bob Semple and Paddy Webb – were jailed and expelled from Parliament for their stand against the war. The loss of leadership threatened to seriously destabilise the party, but the party survived. (Fraser, Semple and Webb later supported conscription in World War II.)

The eight seats compared with 47 for the governing Reform Party and 21 for the Liberal Party.

Although Labour had split with its more militant faction (which went on to form various socialist parties), it maintained what were at the time radical socialist policies. Labour's 'Usehold' policy on land was, in essence, the replacement of freehold tenure by a system of perpetual lease from the state, with all land-transfer conducted through the state (the full nationalisation of farmland). This policy proved unpopular with voters, and Labour dropped it, along with other more radical policies, in the course of the 1920s.

Labour leader Harry Holland became the official Leader of the Opposition on 16 June 1926, after the Eden by-election on 15 April elected Rex Mason (Labour) to replace James Parr (Reform), who had resigned. Labour chose to back United, the party closest to its own views – this put an end to five terms (1912–1928) of Reform Party government.

In the early 1930s the rigours of the Great Depression brought Labour considerable popularity, but also caused tension between Labour and the United Party. In 1931 United passed a number of economic measures which Labour deemed hostile to workers, and the agreement between the two parties collapsed. United then formed a coalition government with Reform, making Labour the Opposition. Harry Holland died in 1933 and his deputy, Michael Joseph Savage, became the Labour Party parliamentary leader.

Several of the early Labour Party stalwarts were Australian-born: Alfred Hindmarsh, Harry Holland, Michael Joseph Savage, Bob Semple, Paddy Webb, Bill Parry and later Jerry Skinner, Mabel Howard, Hugh Watt, Jim Edwards and Dorothy Jelicich.

First Government (1935–1949) 

Party leader Michael Joseph Savage became prime minister on 6 December 1935, marking the beginning of Labour's first term in office. The new government quickly set about implementing a number of significant reforms, including a reorganisation of the social-welfare system and setting up the state housing scheme. Workers also benefited from the introduction of the forty-hour week, and legislation making it easier for unions to negotiate on their behalf. Savage himself was highly popular with the working classes, and his portrait could be found on walls in many houses around the country. At this time the Labour Party pursued an alliance with the Māori Rātana movement.

The parliamentary opposition, meanwhile, attacked the Labour Party's more left-wing policies and accused it of undermining free enterprise and hard work. In May 1936, months after Labour's first general election win, the Reform Party and the United Party took their coalition to the next step, agreeing to merge with each other. The combined organisation, named the National Party, would be Labour's main rival in future years.

Labour also faced opposition within its own ranks. While the Labour Party had been explicitly socialist at its inception, it had gradually drifted away from its earlier radicalism. The death of the party's former leader, the "doctrinaire" Harry Holland, had marked a significant turning-point in the party's history. Some within the party, however, were displeased about the changing focus of the party. Most notably, John A. Lee. Lee, whose views were a mixture of socialism and social credit theory, emerged as a vocal critic of the party's leadership, accusing it of behaving autocratically and of betraying the party's rank and file. After a long and bitter dispute, the Party expelled Lee from the party, who then established his own breakaway Democratic Labour Party.

Savage died in 1940 and Peter Fraser, who became Labour's longest-serving prime minister, replaced him. Fraser became best-known as New Zealand's head of government for most of World War II. In the post-war period, however, ongoing shortages and industrial problems cost Labour considerable popularity, and the National Party, under Sidney Holland, gained ground, although Labour was able to win the 1943 and 1946 elections.

Fraser died shortly afterward, and was replaced by Walter Nash, the long-serving minister of finance. It would be some time before Labour would return to power; Nash lacked the charisma of his predecessors, and National won considerable support for opposing the "industrial anarchy" of the 1951 waterfront dispute.

Second Government (1957–1960) 

Nash, Labour's third prime minister, took office in late 1957. Upon coming to power, Labour decided that drastic measures were needed to address balance-of-payments concerns. This resulted in the highly unpopular 1958 "Black Budget" of Arnold Nordmeyer, the new minister of finance, which raised taxes on alcohol, cigarettes, cars, and petrol. It is widely thought to have doomed the party to defeat despite the economy rejuvenating less than a year after the adoption of the Black Budget.

The elderly Nash retired in 1963, suffering from ill health. Nordmeyer replaced him, but the taint of the Black Budget ensured that Nordmeyer did not have any appreciable success in reversing the party's fortunes. In 1965 the leadership went to the younger Norman Kirk, who many believed would revitalise the party.

Third Government (1972–1975) 

Kirk proved an energetic prime minister and introduced a number of new policies. His foreign-policy stances included strong criticism of nuclear-weapons testing and of South Africa's apartheid system. However, Kirk suffered from poor health, worsened by his refusal to slow the pace of his work. In 1974 Kirk was taken ill and died.

Rowling remained the leader of the Labour Party for some time after his defeat. Rowling himself was compared unfavourably to Muldoon, and did not cope well with Muldoon's aggressive style. In 1983 Rowling was  replaced as parliamentary leader by David Lange, whom the parliamentary caucus perceived as more charismatic.

Fourth Government (1984–1990) 

When the Fourth Labour Government came into power it uncovered a fiscal crisis that had been largely hidden by the outgoing Third National Government. Government debt was skyrocketing, due largely to the costs of borrowing to maintain a fixed exchange-rate. When the result of the election became clear, Lange asked Muldoon to devalue the New Zealand dollar, which Muldoon refused to do, resulting in a constitutional crisis and precipitating some of the changes in the Constitution Act 1986.

The economic-policy agenda of the Fourth Labour Government differed significantly from previous Labour governments. The Minister of Finance, Roger Douglas, supported free-market theories, and sought to implement sweeping reforms ("Rogernomics") to the economy and to the tax system. This involved floating the New Zealand dollar, cutting government spending, reducing taxes and removing almost all industry subsidies. The government also revolutionised New Zealand's foreign policy, making the country a nuclear-free zone, which resulted in suspension from the ANZUS alliance. Labour liberalised immigration policy and promoted migration from Asia.

Other innovations during the term of the Fourth Labour Government included extending the jurisdiction of the Waitangi Tribunal back to 1840 (the date of the signing of the Treaty of Waitangi); the Homosexual Law Reform Act 1986, which legalised homosexual relations; and the Bill of Rights Act, which enumerated civil and political rights. Throughout its first term (1984–1987), the Labour government remained largely unified behind the enacted radical financial, economic and social policy reforms, but early signs of dissension began to appear before the 1987 election.

In  Labour won another considerable election victory against the National Party, while ruptures over the direction of policy remained concealed. Despite taking votes from affluent areas, Labour suffered negative swings in more traditional seats, while the blue-ribbon seat of Remuera nearly fell into the Labour column. The government's second term (1987–1990), with an increased Labour majority won on the back of Lange's anti-nuclear stance, saw emerging divisions over economic policy arising within Cabinet. Ministers debated the extent and pace of further reforms, and there was disillusion among party members and supporters loyal to Labour's left-wing tradition. The Council of Trade Unions criticised the Labour Party. One vocal member of Parliament critical of government policy, Jim Anderton, left the Party to establish the NewLabour Party, which later became a part of the left-wing Alliance Party. At the same time Roger Douglas and Lange fought intermittent battles inside Cabinet, with Douglas wanting to expand his economic programme dramatically. Lange strongly opposed a flat-tax proposal from Douglas and moved to sack him, resulting in political clashes throughout 1988 and the departure of Douglas from the Cabinet in December 1988. After the Labour Caucus re-elected Douglas to Cabinet on 3 August 1989, Lange resigned from office himself (8 August 1989), interpreting Douglas's reappointment as a vote of no confidence in his leadership.

Geoffrey Palmer became the new Labour prime minister. However, Palmer failed to rebuild the shattered remnants of Lange's government and in September 1990, Mike Moore replaced him. Despite Moore's ascension somewhat salvaging poll-ratings, Labour suffered its worst defeat since it first took office in 1935 (losing twenty-eight seats) – voters flung the Party into the political wilderness with an election landslide loss. National swept to power, seemingly repudiating the Lange/Douglas program, but then engaged in even more radical policies than Labour had contemplated. Political disillusionment caused by both governments was to be instrumental in the later adoption of mixed-member proportional representation (MMP) in 1993 (implemented in 1996).

Moore himself, despite recovering sixteen seats at the 1993 election, was replaced by Helen Clark in December 1993. Clark led the party in opposition to the National government for six years under the administrations of Bolger (1993–1997) and Shipley (1997–1999). During this period in opposition, the party made a measured repudiation of Rogernomics, although it has never returned to its original leftist roots (Labour's contemporary position is left-of-centre). Despite initially appearing coherent, the coalition became increasingly unstable and eventually collapsed, leaving the National Party to govern as a minority government from 1998 to 1999.

Fifth Government (1999–2008) 

This government, while undertaking a number of reforms, was not particularly radical when compared to previous Labour governments, and maintained a high level of popularity. The Alliance, however, fell in popularity and split internally. Clark cited the Alliance split as one of the reasons for calling the  several months early; Labour won comfortably.

Policies of the Fifth Labour Government included the KiwiSaver scheme, the Working for Families package, increasing the minimum wage 5% a year, interest-free student loans, the establishment of District Health Boards, the introduction of a number of tax credits, overhauling the secondary-school qualifications system by introducing the NCEA, and the introduction of fourteen weeks' parental leave. Labour also supported the Civil Union Act 2004, which legalised civil unions for same-sex and opposite-sex couples.

In early 2004 Labour came under attack in the foreshore and seabed controversy. Significant internal tensions within the party eventually culminated in the resignation of junior minister Tariana Turia and her establishment of the new Māori Party.

A limited support agreement also linked Labour with the Green Party, giving certain policy concessions to the Greens in return for abstention on confidence-and-supply votes.

In opposition (2008–2017) 

Following the loss to the National Party in the November 2008 election, Helen Clark stood down as leader of the party – Phil Goff succeeded her (serving from 2008–2011). Labour had a relatively high turnover of four leaders during its most recent term in opposition; journalist Nicky Hager has attributed this to Labour's reaction to changes within public media and the political environment.

Shearer resigned after losing the confidence of caucus. David Cunliffe (2013–2014) assumed the leadership after the 2013 leadership election in which, under new rules, members and unions held 60% of the vote. Most of the Labour caucus disliked Cunliffe, but he had strong support from the party membership. In the leadership contest he won first-preference votes from only one-third of Labour MPs. 

Cunliffe's tenure as leader quickly became mired in internal disputes and falling poll-ratings. Labour went on to suffer its worst electoral reversal since 1922 at the  election, Cunliffe opted to resign after initially wishing to re-contest the leadership. His replacement, Andrew Little (2014–2017), then resigned in 2017 following new polling showing the party sinking to a record low result of 24%, with internal voices hoping that rising star Jacinda Ardern would take over in his stead. 

The caucus confirmed Ardern as the new Labour leader (2017–2023). After Ardern's election to its parliamentary leadership Labour rose dramatically in opinion polls. By late August they had risen to 43% in one poll (having been 24% under Little's leadership), as well as managing to overtake National in opinion polls for the first time in over a decade.

Sixth Government (2017–present) 

 
On 19 October 2017, New Zealand First leader Winston Peters announced that his party would form a coalition government with Labour, citing changing international and internal economic circumstances as the reasoning behind his decision, coupled with a belief that a Labour government was best-placed to handle the social and economic welfare of New Zealanders in a global environment that was undergoing rapid and "seismic" change. This coalition, combined with confidence and supply from the Green Party, saw Labour return to government for the first time since 2008. Ardern became prime minister, with Peters as her deputy. The Labour government pledged to eliminate child poverty, make tertiary education free, reduce immigration by 20,000 to 30,000, decriminalise abortion, and make all rivers swimmable within 10 years.

In mid-July 2020, the Serious Fraud Office announced that it was investigating donations made to the Labour Party by two Chinese businessmen during the 2017 general election. Labour Party President Claire Szabó announced that the party would co-operate with the investigation.

Described as a "landslide" victory in which the party won the party vote in "virtually every single electorate", Labour is believed to have gained support from swing voters, many of whom had previously voted for National under John Key. Despite this landslide victory Labour faced criticism from economists due to the government's lack of action on New Zealand's housing affordability crisis, despite it being a key feature of Labour's 2017 election campaign.

On 19 January 2023, Ardern announced her resignation as party leader and therefore prime minister. In the resultant leadership election Chris Hipkins was the only candidate and was confirmed as the new Labour leader on 22 January.

Ideology 
The New Zealand Labour Party's founding 1916 policy objectives called for "the socialisation of the means of production, distribution and exchange", including state ownership of major parts of the economy, and increased rights for workers. Up to the 1980s, Labour remained a party that believed in a strong role for governments in economic and social matters. However, it had been transformed from a union-dominated, socialist-oriented movement into a moderate social-democratic party. The Labour Government of the 1980s deviated sharply from a social-democratic path; in a series of economic reforms, the government removed a swathe of regulations and subsidies, privatised state assets and introduced corporate practices to state services.

The party's constitution and platform programme declares its founding principle as democratic socialism, while observers describe Labour's policies as social-democratic and pragmatic in practice. From the 1990s onwards, Labour has again aimed to use the power of the state to try to achieve a "fairer and more equal society", based on a mixed economy in which both the state and private enterprise play a part. Subsequently, the party has also been described as embracing certain social-liberal policies.

Principles 
According to its current constitution, the party accepts democratic socialist principles, including:
 The management of New Zealand's natural resources for the benefit of all, including future generations.
 Equal access to all social, economic, cultural, political, and legal spheres, regardless of wealth or social position.
 Co-operation as the main governing factor in economic relations, to ensure a just distribution of wealth.
 Universal rights to dignity, self-respect, and the opportunity to work.
 The right to wealth and property, subject to the provisos of regarding people as always more important than property and the obligations of the state to ensure a just distribution of wealth.
 Honouring  / the Treaty of Waitangi as the founding document of New Zealand.
 The promotion of peace and social justice throughout the world by international co-operation.
 Equality in human rights regardless of race, sex, marital status, sexual orientation, gender identity, age, religious faith, political belief or disability.

Voter base 
Historically, the party drew upon a stable sectional voter base comprising the urban working class, predominantly manual labourers and trade unionists. From the 1930s onwards, Labour has increasingly positioned itself as a broad-based party by responding and adapting to different social and economic problems and changing demographics (appealing to an expanding migrant population and a diversified ethnic, social make-up). Beginning in the 1980s, there was a shift away from class-issues and towards the promotion of individual freedoms, particularly for members of disadvantaged groups such as women and Māori. The modern party's core support base lies among young people, urban workers, civil servants, and minorities (particularly the Māori and Pasifika communities).

Organisation

Party structure

General and special branches 
Party membership is tied into geographically-based branches in each parliamentary electorate. General branches must consist of at least 10 members aged 15 or over. Members may also form special branches where they have a special community of interest (such as university students and academics, young people, women, Māori people, Pasifika, multicultural groups, people with disabilities, the LGBT community and industrial workers). Influential branches include Princes Street Labour (this Auckland university branch is described as the "ideological powerhouse of the party", and has contributed many prominent Labour politicians) and Vic Labour (the Victoria University of Wellington branch).

Membership figures are rarely released to the public. Full (non-affiliate) membership is known to have peaked at 55,000 in 1976. During the 1980s and 1990s, party membership plummeted to levels not seen since before the First Labour Government. This decline might be attributed to disillusionment on the part of some members with the economic policies of the Fourth Labour Government ("Rogernomics"). Membership figures began to recover under Helen Clark's leadership, with 14,000 members recorded in 2002.

Conference, councils and committees 
Delegates from all branches in the electorate, together with delegates from affiliated unions, make up the Labour Electorate Committee (LEC). The LEC is responsible for party organisation in the electorate. The party is divided into six regional areas, which each year convene a Regional Conference. Policy and other matters are debated and passed onto the Annual Conference.

The Annual Conference (called Congress in election years) is the supreme governing body of the Labour Party when it is in session. All constituent bodies of the party are entitled to send delegates to Annual Conference.

The New Zealand Council is the Labour Party's governing executive. It ensures that the party is governed effectively according to its constitution. The NZ Council consists of the president, two senior vice presidents (one of which must be Māori), three vice presidents (representing women, affiliates, and Pacific Islanders), seven regional representatives, one Policy Council representative, three Caucus representatives, and the general secretary.

The Policy Council, responsible for the development of the policy platform and election manifesto, is elected for a three-year term following each general election. The party structure also provides for Special Interest Group Councils: representing the affiliates, women's issues, Māori issues, Pacific Islands, primary industries, local government, and youth.

Caucus and parliamentary leadership 

The elected members representing the Labour Party in the House of Representatives meet as the Parliamentary Labour Party, also called the Caucus. The current parliamentary leader is Chris Hipkins (since 22 January 2023). A leadership election is triggered upon the vacancy of the position of leader or a motion of no confidence. Candidates are nominated from within the Caucus. Under Labour Party rules, party members have 40% of the votes, MPs have another 40% of the votes, and affiliated unions have 20% of the votes. Some observers have criticised the influence of the unions in leadership elections.

Affiliated trade unions 
In the first decades of the 20th century, manufacturing industries grew strongly in New Zealand's main cities and union membership also increased. The Labour Party was formed in this period as the political wing of the labour movement and was financed by trade unions. Since then, the unions have retained close institutional links with the party. There are currently six unions that are directly affiliated to the party and pay affiliation fees, as well as receiving a percentage of the vote in party leadership elections. These unions are the following:
 E tū – created through the merger of the Engineering, Printing and Manufacturing Union and the Service & Food Workers Union in 2015.
 Maritime Union of New Zealand (MUNZ)
 New Zealand Dairy Workers Union (DWU)
 New Zealand Meat & Related Trades Workers Union (MWU)
 Rail and Maritime Transport Union (RMTU)
 Central Amalgamated Workers' Union (CAWU)

In addition, the president of the New Zealand Council of Trade Unions continues to speak at the Labour Party Annual Conference.

Young Labour 

Young Labour is the party's youth wing. It exists to organise young party members (and young members of affiliated unions) aged under 30, and encourage wider involvement of young New Zealanders in centre-left politics. Young Labour is the most active sector in the Labour Party and plays a significant role in policy development and campaign efforts. It is endearingly called the "conscience of the party".

In March 2018, it was reported that four people under 16 were allegedly sexually assaulted at a Young Labour summer camp in February. The camp was said to have "mountains of alcohol", and people under the legal drinking age of 18 were said to have consumed alcohol. Although Young Labour and the Labour Party were aware of the allegations, party leadership failed to tell the Prime Minister, Jacinda Ardern. The party offered counselling and support after the allegations were publicly reported. An independent review into the party's conduct and sexual assault complaint policy was announced by Party President Nigel Haworth, and was completed late August. The party has declined to release the report to the public.

Local government 
Labour Party members including current and former Members of Parliament have contested various local government positions throughout New Zealand during local body elections. While several have stood as Labour Party candidates, others have contested the elections as independent politicians.

Auckland
Labour has contested the Auckland local body elections alongside City Vision, a left-wing electoral ticket representing the local Labour, Green parties and other progressives. Following the 2022 Auckland local elections, the Auckland Council had four councillors serving under the Labour ticket and one serving under the affiliated City Vision ticket. In addition, 26 Labour Party candidates were elected to local community boards across Auckland while four Labour candidates were elected to local licensing trusts in the Auckland Region. Meanwhile, seven City Vision local board members and three City Vision liquor licensing trust members were also elected.

Former Labour MP and cabinet minister Phil Goff served as mayor of Auckland for two terms between 2016 and 2022.

Christchurch
In Christchurch, former Labour MP and cabinet minister Lianne Dalziel served for three terms as mayor between 2013 and 2022. She ran as an independent 

Within the Christchurch City Council, Labour maintains an umbrella, including community independents called The People's Choice (formerly Christchurch 2021). During the 2019 Christchurch local elections, People's Choice candidates held 10 community board seats, seven council seats, and several community board chairmanships.

Dunedin
On 26 February 2016, Dunedin city councillor and former Labour MP David Benson-Pope announced that he would be contesting the Dunedin local elections in October under the "Local Labour" ticket. While still a Labour Party member, Benson Pope had stood in the 2013 local elections as an independent candidate. This report coincided with the dissolution of the city's main local body ticket, the centre-left Greater Dunedin group. On 20 April, it was reported that the Labour Party had dropped its plan to field a bloc of candidates in the 2016 Dunedin elections. However, the party has not ruled out endorsing other candidates. 

During the 2019 local elections, Steve Walker and Marian Hobbs were elected to the Dunedin City Council and Otago Regional Council respectively on Labour Party tickets. Hobbs subsequently resigned from the Otago Regional Council in November 2021.

During the 2022 Dunedin local elections, Steve Walker and Joy Davis stood as Labour candidates for the Dunedin City Council. While Walker was re-elected, Davis failed to win a seat.

New Plymouth
In New Plymouth, former MP Harry Duynhoven served as mayor from 2010 to 2013, when he was defeated by Andrew Judd.

Palmerston North
Beginning in 2016, the Labour Party began contesting the Palmerston North local elections, ending a long tradition of keeping national party political affiliations out of local government bodies. During the 2016 local elections, Lorna Johnson was elected on the Labour Party ticket to the Palmerston North City Council. During the 2019 local elections, she was joined by Zulfiqar Butt, who also stood on the Labour ticket. During the 2022 local elections, Johnson was re-elected to the Palmerston North City Council but Butt was defeated.

Rotorua
Former  electorate then Labour list MP Steve Chadwick, was elected as mayor of Rotorua in the 2013 elections. She stood as an independent. She served for three terms before resigning in 2022.

Wellington Region
During the 2022 Wellington local elections, four Labour Party councillors were elected: Ben McNulty – Northern Ward, Rebecca Matthews – Onslow-Western Ward,  Teri O'Neill – Eastern Ward, and Nureddin Abdurahman - Southern Ward. Labour MP Paul Eagle unsuccessfully contested the 2022 Wellington mayoral election but came third place.

Daran Ponter of the Wellington City ward on the Greater Wellington Regional Council was the only councillor to have been re-elected on a Labour ticket during the 2022 Wellington local election.

Campbell Barry has been the mayor of Lower Hutt since 2019 and was re-elected on the Labour ticket along with Wainuiomata ward councilor Keri Brown during the 2022 Hutt City Council elections.

Whanganui
In Whanganui, Labour member Hamish McDouall served two terms as mayor until he was defeated by Andrew Tripe during the 2022 local elections. McDouall had previously contested the seat of Whanganui for the party. McDouall ran on an independent ticket.

Electoral results

Parliamentary 

 Labour did not contest every electorate until 1946, when it stood candidates in all 80 electorates. According to the National Executive reports, the number of official candidates in 1919 is uncertain (53 or possibly 46). The party ran 41 candidates in 1922; 56 in 1925; 55 in 1928; 53 in 1931; 70 in 1935; 78 in 1938; and 77 in 1943. Labour did not run against independent candidates who voted with Labour, such as Harry Atmore in Nelson and David McDougall in Mataura, Southland. Labour did not run candidates against the two Country Party candidates in 1935, but did in 1938, when both candidates were defeated.

Māori electorates

Leadership 

The Labour Party has had 17 leaders, 11 of whom have served as prime minister. To date, Helen Clark served longest as leader of the Labour Party. While some dispute exists as to when Harry Holland officially became leader, Clark had passed his longest possible leadership term by 26 October 2008.

List of leaders 
The following is a complete list of Labour Party leaders in the House of Representatives:
Key:

PM: Prime Minister
LO: Leader of the Opposition
†: Died in office

List of deputy leaders 
The following is a complete list of Labour Party deputy leaders:

List of presidents 

The following is a complete list of Labour Party presidents:

See also 

 City Vision, a prominent Auckland Council political ticket composed of Labour and Green Party members
 List of Labour parties
 List of New Zealand Labour Party MPs
 Politics of New Zealand
 Rainbow Labour

References

Citations

Sources 

 
 
 
 
  (with Biographical appendix)

External links 

 
 Official website for City Vision – the Auckland Local Government Group that includes Labour candidates

 
1916 establishments in New Zealand
Former member parties of the Socialist International
Labour parties
New Zealand politics-related lists
Political parties established in 1916
Labour
Progressive Alliance
Centre-left parties
Social democratic parties
Socialist parties in New Zealand